Rhynchoferella simplex is a moth in the Copromorphidae family. It is found in Cameroon and Ghana.

References

Natural History Museum Lepidoptera generic names catalog

Copromorphidae